Adalat may refer to:

 Adalat, a brand name for the heart drug Nifedipine
 Adalat (1958 film), a Bollywood drama
 Adalat (1976 film), a Bollywood action drama
 Adaalat, an Indian TV courtroom drama anthology series

See also
 Aap Ki Adalat, an Indian TV show 
 Adalat Party, later the Communist Party of Persia
 Janta Ki Adalat, a 1994 Hindi film 
 Lok Adalat, a system of alternative dispute resolution in India
 Meri Adalat, a 1984 Hindi film